The National Coracle Centre is a museum in Cenarth, Carmarthenshire dedicated to coracles. It is owned by Martin Fowler and entry is via the wall of his boutique. It has on display coracles from around the world including Tibetan and Iraqi examples as well as British.

References

External links
The National Coracle Centre website

Museums in Carmarthenshire
Maritime museums in Wales